The Second Buddhist council took place at Vaishali (modern-day Bihar state in India) approximately one hundred years after the Buddha's parinirvāṇa, so perhaps around 300 BCE. The Second Council resulted in the first schism in the Sangha, probably caused by a group of rigorist reformists called Sthaviras who split from the majority Mahāsāṃghikas. After unsuccessfully trying to modify the Vinaya, a small group of "elderly members", i.e. sthaviras, broke away from the majority Mahāsāṃghika during the Second Buddhist council, giving rise to the Sthavira sect.

Modern scholarship

Addition of Vinaya rules
The Second Council is commonly said to have resulted in the first schism in the Sangha, probably caused by a group of rigorist reformists called Sthaviras who split from the more liberal, but orthodox, majority Mahāsāṃghikas. After unsuccessfully trying to modify the Vinaya, a small group of "elderly members", i.e. sthaviras, broke away from the majority Mahāsāṃghika during the Second Buddhist council, giving rise to the Sthavira sect. Regarding this matter, L. S. Cousins writes, "The Mahāsāṃghikas were essentially a conservative party resisting a reformist attempt to tighten discipline. The likelihood is that they were initially a larger body, representing the mass of the community, the mahāsaṃgha."

It seems however that the council, with four representatives from each group, both condemned the lax practices of the Vaisali monks. Therefore the schism did not occur at this time. 
Instead, it seems the introduction of more rigorous rules was attempted shortly after a second Second Council, where the new interpretation was rejected and led to the 'schism'. 

The Śāriputraparipṛcchā contains an account in which an old monk rearranges and augments the traditional Vinaya, consequently causing dissension among the monks that required the king's arbitration and eventually precipitating the first schism. As stated in the Śāriputraparipṛcchā:

Scholars have generally agreed that the matter of dispute was indeed a matter of vinaya, and have noted that the account of the Mahāsāṃghikas is bolstered by the vinaya texts themselves, as vinayas associated with the Sthaviras do contain more rules than those of the Mahāsāṃghika Vinaya. For example, the Mahāsāṃghika Prātimokṣa has 67 rules in the śaikṣa-dharma section, while the Theravāda version has 75 rules.

Mahādeva legend
According to the Theravadin account, the Second Council occurred in Vaiśālī. Its purpose was to adjudicate on ten points which amounted to minor infringements of the Vinaya, such as handling money and eating after midday. The council was convened, and an elder rendered a verdict condemning the ten points, after which the council was closed. According to this account, some 35 years later at Pāṭaliputra, there was another meeting over five points held by a figure named Mahādeva. These five points were essentially regarding doctrines of the fallibility and imperfection of arhats, which were opposed by some. In this account, the majority (Mahāsaṃgha) sided with Mahādeva, and the minority (Sthaviras) were opposed to it, thus causing a split in the Saṃgha. However, the Samayabhedoparacanacakra records that Mahādeva was a completely different figure who was the founder of the Caitika sect over 200 years later. Some scholars have concluded that an association of "Mahādeva" with the first schism was a later sectarian interpolation. Jan Nattier and Charles Prebish write:

Vinaya antiquity
Modern scholarship is generally in agreement that the Mahāsāṃghika Vinaya is the oldest. This agrees well with the views of the Chinese monk Faxian, who travelled to India in order to procure the Mahāsāṃghika Vinaya, which was regarded as the original. According to Andrew Skilton, future scholars may determine that a study of the Mahāsāṃghika school will contribute to a better understanding of the early Dharma-Vinaya than the Theravāda school.

Theravadin account

According to the traditional Theravadin account, the dispute arose over the 'Ten Points.' This is a reference to ten modifications of the Buddhist monastic discipline observed among the monks of Vesali. The specific ten points were:

Storing salt in a horn.
Eating after midday.
Eating once and then going again to a village for alms.
Monks within the same ritual boundary conducting official acts of the Sangha independently.
Carrying out official acts when the assembly was incomplete.
Following a certain practice because it was done by one's tutor or teacher.
Eating semi-churned butter after one had his midday meal.
Consuming unfermented toddy.
Sitting on a cloth without a border.
Using gold and silver.

The inciting issue, according to the Sattasata of the Theravada Vinaya Pitaka, was the use of 'gold and silver', an Indic idiom that includes any kind of money. The monks of Vesali had become accustomed to lay followers donating coins in order to pay for the needs of the community, to which the visiting monk Yasa objected.

Yasa's objection became known to lay supporters, who began to regard the Vesali monks as corrupt. In response, both the monks of Vesali and Yasa gathered senior members of the Sangha from the region to consult in order to settle the issue of monastic law.

All of the ten points concerned dukkata or sekhiya rules, minor offenses of the monastic code.

The Second Buddhist Council made the unanimous decision not to relax any of the rules. The sixth issue, regarding following the customs of one's teacher or tutor, was declared indeterminate. The gathered group of 700 monks recited the unanimous decision together, an event which lends its name to the Sattasata text of the Vinaya Pitaka, likely a reference to the earlier Pañcasata, or recitation of the 500.

See also
Buddhist councils
First Buddhist council
Third Buddhist council
Fourth Buddhist council
Fifth Buddhist council
Sixth Buddhist council

References

External links
Bhikkhu Sujato. Sects & Sectarianism: The Origins of Buddhist Schools
Theravadin account of the Second Council: part 1 and part 2.
Account of the Second Council from the Mahavamsa

Buddhist council2
Buddhist councils
4th-century BC Buddhism
Religious schisms